Hamish Bryce (born 12 November 1941) is a former Scotland international rugby union player.

Rugby union career

Amateur career

He played for London Scottish. and Bristol Rugby Club.

Provincial career

He played for the Anglo-Scots district side.

International career

He was capped twice by Scotland 'B', from 1971 to 1972.

He went on to secure his first and only senior international cap for Scotland in 1973, coming on as a replacement prop against Ireland.

Business career

Bryce received a Bachelor of Mechanical Sciences from Cambridge University in 1966. He joined the British Army as was in the Royal Engineers. Becoming a chartered engineer, he held posts in various lighting firms; before becoming Chief Executive of the Thorn group  He was also Chair of the London Business Resilience Group  as well a board member of the Design Council

References

1941 births
Living people
Scotland international rugby union players
Scotland 'B' international rugby union players
Scottish Exiles (rugby union) players
London Scottish F.C. players
Rugby union props